Razvilka is a rural locality (a settlement) in Leninsky District of Moscow Oblast, Russia, located in the "green forests and parks space" surrounding the city of Moscow, on the Kashira Highway. Population:   Postal code: 142717.  Telephone code: +7 495.

Razvilka was founded in 1947 as a settlement for employees of the Scientific Institute of Natural Gases (VNIIGAZ) and its experimental factory.  Currently, enterprises of the natural gas industry are located in the settlement, which earned an unofficial name of the "gas capital of Russia".

The infrastructure of the settlement includes a clinic, drugstores, a dental clinic, a secondary school, a college, kindergartens, a Russian Orthodox church, a church education centre, supermarkets, car-maintenance facilities, a fire depot, and a police department. The local cable TV station is KTV-Razvilka.

The settlement is connected with Moscow by five bus lines: #44 to railway station Rastorguyevo, #95, #355, #356 to Domodedovskaya station of the Moscow Metro, and #897 to Maryino metro station.

Images

References

External links
Official website of Razvilka 

Rural localities in Moscow Oblast